Armenia competed at the 2002 Winter Olympics in Salt Lake City, United States.

Alpine skiing

Men

Women

Bobsleigh

Men

Cross-country skiing

Men
Sprint

Pursuit

1 Starting delay based on 10 km C. results. 
C = Classical style, F = Freestyle

Women
Sprint

Pursuit

2 Starting delay based on 5 km C. results. 
C = Classical style, F = Freestyle

Figure skating

Women

Pairs

References
Official Olympic Reports
 Olympic Winter Games 2002, full results by sports-reference.com

Nations at the 2002 Winter Olympics
2002
2002 in Armenian sport